Zeki Müren (6 December 1931 – 24 September 1996) was a Turkish singer, composer, songwriter, actor and poet. Known by the nicknames "The Sun of Art" and "Pasha", he was one of the prominent figures of  Turkish classical music. Due to his contributions to the art industry, he was named a "State Artist" in 1991. He was the first singer to receive a gold certification in Turkey and throughout his career recorded and released hundreds of songs on cassettes and phonograph records.

Life

Childhood and education 
Müren was born in the Hisar district of Bursa, at the wooden house number 30 on Ortapazar Road as the only child of Kaya and Hayriye Müren. His father was a timber merchant. He was a small and impatient boy. At the age of 11 he was circumcised in Bursa.

Müren went to the Bursa Osmangazi School (later Tophane School and Alkıncı School). When he was at school, his musical ability was discovered by his teachers and he started to have a prominent role at school musicals. His first ever role was the character of a shepherd in one of these musicals.

He finished his secondary school in Bursa and then asked his father to let him go to Istanbul. There he attended the Istanbul Boğaziçi High School. He finished the school and ended up as the number-one student. After passing his exams, he was enrolled at the Istanbul State Academy of Fine Arts (now Mimar Sinan University) where he studied decorative arts from 1950 to 1953.

Music career 

In 1950, while he was a university student, he took part at TRT Istanbul Radio's music competition and ranked number-one out of 186 contestants. On 1 January 1951, he had his first live performance on Istanbul Radio, which was praised by critics. During this performance, he was accompanied by musicians Hakkı Derman, Serif İçli, Şükrü Tunar, Refik Fersan and Necdet Gezen. Hamiyet Yüceses subsequently called the program and congratulated him on his performance. In those years, TRT Ankara Radio was the most listened radio in Anatolia, and Istanbul Radio could not be heard clearly from all parts of Anatolia. At the same week, the clarinetist Şükrü Tunar, took Müren to his own recording studio in Yeşilköy and he recorded his song "Muhabbet Kuşu" on phonograph record. Thanks to this record, Müren became known all over Anatolia.

After the success of his first live performance and his first record, Müren began to perform different songs on Turkish radios. His radio programs went on air for 15 years, most of which included live performances. Müren subsequently focused on giving concerts and recording new songs. He had his first live concert on 26 May 1955. He would usually wear his self-designed clothes on stage. He brought various innovations such as dressing uniforms and using T podium.

Together with Behiye Aksoy, he performed at Maksim Casino for 11 years. In 1976, he became the first Turkish artist to perform at the Royal Albert Hall in London.

Throughout his career, Müren recorded 600 cassettes and phonograph records. His first song recorded on a phonograph was "Bir Muhabbet Kuşu"  by Şükrü Tunar. With his song "Manolyam" in 1955, Müren became the first Turkish artist to receive a gold certification. In 1991, he was chosen as a State Artist.

Other ventures 
In 1965, he published a poetry book called Bıldırcın Yağmuru (The Quail Rain), which contains nearly 100 poems. Among the poems featured in this book are Pembe Yağmurlar (Pink Rains), Bursa Sokağı (Bursa Street), İkinci Sadık Dost, Çim Makası, Son Kavga (Last Fight), Bu Bestecikler Sana, Alınyazım, Kazancı Yokuşu and Kendimi Arıyorum.

Personal life 
Zeki Müren never married. In the 1950s, with his special patterns of behavior, dressing and his performance on stage, he managed to keep people constantly interested in himself. In the early years of his career, he chose to wear ordinary clothes and hair styles, but later showed a favor for feminine-styled clothes, and performed with new hair styles and make-up. He never commented on his sexual orientation and occasionally his name appeared alongside that of women. The general opinion was that he was gay.Shidfar, Farhad (2005). "Gay musicians in Turkey". International Forum of Psychoanalysis, vol. 14(3–4) 224–226, Routledge, part of the Taylor & Francis Group
 
He was known to speak Turkish with a viscous accent. Referred to as the "Pasha of Music", in 1969, after his Aspendos concert, for the first time, he started being favored by the people of Antalya. He explained that although he was delighted because of their support, he still did not know why he was that much favored. He served as an assistant officer in Ankara Infantry School (6 months), Istanbul Harbiye Representative Office (6 months) and Çankırı (3 months) in 1957–1958. With Onur Akay's suggestion on TRT Music, Müren's date of birth (6 December) has been celebrated as the Turkish Art Music Day since 2012.

Illness and death 

During the last 6 years of his life, Müren was away from the scenes and the media due to heart disease and diabetes. He was retired at his house in Bodrum. He described this period as a time for "listening to oneself". On 24 September 1996, during the ceremony held for him at TRT İzmir Television, he had a heart attack and died. His funeral ceremony was attended by a large number of people. His body was taken to his birth place, Bursa, and buried in Emirsultan Cemetery.
 
He left all his assets in his will to the Turkish Education Foundation and Mehmetçik Foundation. TEV and Mehmetçik Foundation built Zeki Müren Fine Arts Anatolian High School in Bursa in 2002. In a statement on 24 September 2016, TEV Bursa branch president Mehmet Çalışkan said that the foundation had helped 2,631 students with the Zeki Müren Scholarship Fund over the last 20 years.

After his death, the house in which the artist lived in Bodrum for the last years of his life was transformed into Zeki Müren Art Museum by the order of the Ministry of Culture and was opened to the public on 8 June 2000. It was visited by more than 200 thousand people between its opening on 8 June 2000 and December 2006.

In popular culture 
On 6 December 2018, a Google Doodle was displayed to celebrate his 87th birthday.

Discography

Studio albums 
 Albums published during his lifetime

Singles

Compilation albums

Albums released abroad

Duo albums

Albums released posthumously 
 2000: Muazzez Abacı ve Zeki Müren Düet
 2002: Zeki Müren: 1955-1963 Kayıtları
 2005: Selahattin Pınar Şarkıları
 2005: Sadettin Kaynak Şarkıları
 2006: Batmayan Güneş
 2008: Baş Başa Radyo Günleri 1
 2008: Baş Başa Radyo Günleri 2
 2008: Baş Başa Radyo Günleri 3
 2009: Lunapark Konseri
 2009: Saklı Kayıtlar 1952-1984

In addition to these, there are 12 other albums attributed to Zeki Müren published during 1968–1974 by Grafson Plak.

Filmography

International titles are given in parentheses.

Others

See also
 Turkish classical music
 Turkish music

References

External links

 Türk Sanat Müziğinin Güneşi Zeki Müren Kimdir?
 Life story video of Zeki Müren
 Discography of Zeki Müren
 A sample of Müren's music on YouTube

1931 births
1996 deaths
People from Bursa
Turkish classical singers
Turkish singer-songwriters
State Artists of Turkey
20th-century Turkish male singers
People with diabetes